Miguel Avramovic (born 18 July 1981 in Buenos Aires) is an Argentine rugby union footballer currently playing for Agen in the Top 14. He has also played for Worcester Warriors in the Premiership.  He usually plays in at centre or fullback. He has 11 caps and 20 points (5 tries for Los Pumas.

He had 11 caps for the Argentina national team, from 2005 to 2009. He made his international debut for Argentina in April 2005 in a match against Japan. He then played two games for Argentina A in June, against the United States and a non-cap England XV. He earned another full two caps that year playing against Canada in July, and against Samoa in December. He played against Uruguay in July 2006 in what was a 2007 Rugby World Cup qualifying match.

References

1981 births
Rugby union players from Buenos Aires
Argentine rugby union players
Worcester Warriors players
Living people
Rugby union centres
Argentine people of Serbian descent
Argentina international rugby union players
Argentine expatriate rugby union players
Expatriate rugby union players in England
Argentine expatriate sportspeople in England
A
Argentine expatriate sportspeople in France
SU Agen Lot-et-Garonne players
US Montauban players
Expatriate rugby union players in France
Pampas XV players